João Vitor Salla Vivan (born 31 May 1996) is a Brazilian futsal player who plays as a defender for Carlos Barbosa and the Brazilian national futsal team.

References

External links
Liga Nacional de Futsal profile
Associação Carlos Barbosa de Futsal profile

1996 births
Living people
Brazilian men's futsal players